The Detroit Gems were an American professional basketball team based in Detroit, Michigan. It played one season, 1946–47, in the Western Division of the National Basketball League, a predecessor organization to the National Basketball Association. Following the season, the franchise was sold to Minneapolis to become the Minneapolis Lakers.

History
The Gems, that was mostly made up of local players and coached by Joel Mason. It started its season with an exhibition game against the Oshkosh All-Stars, a 54–69 loss. It started its 44-game regular season schedule on 11 November in Anderson, Indiana, with a loss against the Anderson Duffey Packers.

For the season, the Gems won only 4 out of 44 games, finishing last in the league. The franchise was put up for a sale following the season and purchased for US$15,000 by Ben Berger and Morris Chalfen and relocated to Minneapolis to become the Minneapolis Lakers.

References

External links
1946–47 statistics at Basketball Reference

Basketball teams
Basketball teams established in 1946
Gems
1946 establishments in Michigan